Božidar Jelovac (Serbian Cyrillic: Божидар Јеловац ; born 31 July 1987 in Karlovac) is a Serbian football forward who currently plays for Utica City FC in the Major Arena Soccer League. Jelovac had also previously played for the GBFC Thunder.

In September 2021, Jelovac renewed his contract with Utica City.

References

External links
 

1987 births
Living people
Footballers from Belgrade
Serbian footballers
FK Smederevo players
Serbian SuperLiga players
Vermont Voltage players
USL League Two players
National Premier Soccer League players
Association football forwards
Utica City FC players
Major Arena Soccer League players
Albany Great Danes men's soccer players
Serbian expatriate footballers
Expatriate soccer players in the United States
Serbian expatriate sportspeople in the United States
FK Radnički Beograd players
FK Bežanija players
SK Dynamo České Budějovice players
Serbia youth international footballers